Tahar El Khalej (pronounced Taher Lakhlej ) (born 16 June 1968) is a retired Moroccan footballer who played as a defender.

Club career
Born in Marrakech, El Khalej started at Kawkab Marrakech in 1990, spending four seasons there, helping them win one league title and two national cups. In 1994, he moved to Portugal to sign with UD Leiria, at the time, recently promoted to the first tier. Making his debut on 22 October 1994, against Vitória de Guimarães, he was frequently used as midfielder alongside Mário Artur and Abel. After two seasons in Leiria, El Khalej joined Benfica in 1997. He made his debut on 9 September 1997 and went on to amass nearly 100 appearances, 72 in the league, without winning any silverware.

With the arrival of Jupp Heynckes, El Khalej lost influence and made only 4 league appearances, two as substitute in the 1999–2000 season, so he moved to Southampton in March 2000  for £350,000, as Glenn Hoddle's first signing for his new club, although the deal had already been arranged by Dave Jones. He scored on his debut in a 7–2 defeat against Tottenham Hotspur on 11 March 2000. Faced with stiff competition as a central defender from Claus Lundekvam and Dean Richards, he was later employed in a midfield role.

One of his more notable moments was during a match against Newcastle on 12 May 2002, where he made a reckless lunge on Kieron Dyer , which earned him a straight red card. Dyer was injured for months afterwards and threatened Tahar with legal action if Dyer had missed the 2002 World Cup, which did not happen. In January 2003, El Khalej moved to Charlton Athletic on a six-month deal after 65 appearances for the Saints, scoring four goals.

At the end of the season, he returned to Morocco retiring from professional football. He then worked as president of Kawkab Marrakech in 2005–06 when they played in the Moroccan 2nd division, achieving promotion to the Moroccan first division before he left the club.

International career
He played for the Morocco national football team and was a participant at the 1994 FIFA World Cup and at the 1998 FIFA World Cup.

Personal life
He is married and has two sons, Yassine and Ahmed.

References

External links

1968 births
Living people
Sportspeople from Marrakesh
Moroccan footballers
Moroccan expatriate footballers
Morocco international footballers
1992 African Cup of Nations players
1994 FIFA World Cup players
1998 FIFA World Cup players
1998 African Cup of Nations players
2000 African Cup of Nations players
Botola players
U.D. Leiria players
S.L. Benfica footballers
Southampton F.C. players
Charlton Athletic F.C. players
Premier League players
Primeira Liga players
Expatriate footballers in England
Expatriate footballers in Portugal
Moroccan expatriate sportspeople in England
Moroccan expatriate sportspeople in Portugal
Kawkab Marrakech players
Association football fullbacks
Mediterranean Games bronze medalists for Morocco
Mediterranean Games medalists in football
Competitors at the 1991 Mediterranean Games